College Sainte-Marie is a private secondary school based in Quatre Bornes, Mauritius. Students are prepared for the School Certificate and the Higher School Certificate.

The school began enrolling students in September 2004.

The school was scheduled to open on 17 January 2005, with priority given to students attending primary schools in Curepipe and Vacoas and with monthly tuition being 3,800 Rs.

See also
 Education in Mauritius
 List of secondary schools in Mauritius

References

External links 
 College Sainte-Marie
 
 

Secondary schools in Mauritius
Quatre Bornes
2005 establishments in Mauritius
Educational institutions established in 2005